Protein p13 MTCP-1 is a protein that in humans is encoded by the MTCP1 gene.

Function 

This gene was identified by involvement in some t(X;14) translocations associated with mature T-cell proliferations. The gene has two ORFs that encode two different proteins. The upstream ORF encodes a 13kDa protein that is a member of the TCL1 family; this protein may be involved in leukemogenesis. The downstream ORF encodes an 8kDa protein that localizes to mitochondria. Alternative splicing results in multiple transcript variants.

Interactions 

MTCP1 has been shown to interact with AKT1.

References

Further reading